The 2020–21 season was the 141st season of competitive association football in England.

National teams

England national football team

Results and fixtures

Friendlies

UEFA Nations League

Group 2

2022 FIFA World Cup qualification

Group I

UEFA Euro 2020

Group D

Knockout phase

England women's national football team

Results and fixtures

Friendlies

UEFA competitions

UEFA Champions League

Group stage

Group C

Group D

Group E

Group H

Knockout phase

Round of 16 

|}

Quarter-finals

|}

Semi-finals

|}

Final

UEFA Europa League

UEFA Europa League qualifying phase and play-off round

Second qualifying round

|}

Third qualifying round

|}

Play-off round

|}

Group stage

Group B

Group G

Group J

Knockout phase

Round of 32

|}

Round of 16

|}

Notes

Quarter-finals

|}

Semi-finals

|}

Final

UEFA Youth League

On 17 February 2021, the UEFA Executive Committee cancelled the tournament.

UEFA Champions League Path

|}

UEFA Women's Champions League

Knockout phase

Round of 32

|}

Round of 16

|}

Quarter-finals

|}

Semi-finals

|}

Final

Men's football

Premier League

In a season played almost entirely behind closed doors, because of COVID-19 restrictions, Manchester City overcame a shaky start to the campaign and secured their third Premier League title in four seasons – having stood in eighth place in mid-December, the team went on an impressive 13-match winning run that sent them rocketing up the table and into first place, despite a succession of unexpected losses in the closing stages of the season, securing the title on top of a fourth consecutive League Cup victory and reaching their first ever Champions League final, losing in an all-English final to Chelsea. City rivals Manchester United finished not far behind them, despite not really being in the title race for much of the season, a consequence of a poor start which included three home losses in their opening six games (with further losses to Sheffield United, Leicester City and Liverpool at the turn of the year); however, the Red Devils at least ensured Champions League football once again, thanks in part to a remarkable run of form that saw them go unbeaten away from home all season.

The battle for the last two Champions League spots ended up going to the final day, with Chelsea, Leicester City and Liverpool battling it out – remarkably taking third spot were Liverpool, whose first title defence since 1990 ended up being one of struggle; whilst the Merseyside club stood top at the end of 2020, a complete collapse in form in the new year saw both the team's hopes of retaining the title as well as their 68-game unbeaten run at Anfield practically implode under the weight of both a lack of fans and an extensive injury crisis, including a season-ending injury to star defender Virgil van Dijk just five games into the campaign – however, a strong late run of form, coupled with the teams above them dropping points, helped the Reds to close the gap and squeeze into the top four. Chelsea finished fourth, a strong second half of the season under new manager Thomas Tuchel pushing the Blues from as low as ninth near the end of January to both securing a Champions League spot again and winning their first Champions League final since 2012 with victory over Manchester City, ending a mixed season (which included a second consecutive FA Cup final loss in a row) on a high. Having spent the most days in the top four for the season, another stuttering end to the league saw Leicester City finish fifth yet again and just barely miss out on the Champions League, with inferior home form compared to form on the road ultimately costing them; however, the Foxes at least finished the season with a trophy, winning their first ever FA Cup final and giving manager Brendan Rodgers his first piece of silverware with the club.

Finishing sixth were West Ham United, who surprised many in the season and went one further than their seventh-place finish in 2016 in manager David Moyes' first full campaign as Hammers boss, securing their biggest Premier League points total and a Europa League group spot for next year – the only blemish being an inconsistent end to the season, which cost what could have been potentially a shock top-four finish. North London rivals Arsenal and Tottenham Hotspur endured difficult form across their campaigns, the Gunners even hovering above the drop zone in December, whilst Spurs briefly led the table just before Christmas; a dismal second half of the season though would see Spurs plummet down the table and ultimately culminate in Jose Mourinho being sacked in late April; under interim coach Ryan Mason, Spurs recovered to seventh and a place in the brand new Europa Conference League competition for the following season; Arsenal finished eighth for the second successive campaign, but would be left without any European football next season for the first time in 26 years. Leeds United's first top-flight season since 2004 proved to be ultimately successful for the Yorkshire side, both the team and veteran Argentine manager Marcelo Bielsa attracting plenty of praise for their attacking football and providing some spectacular results even in defeat, the Lilywhites comfortably securing 59 points, the highest for a promoted side since 2001.

Despite achieving some superb results, including taking four points off city rivals Liverpool in two controversial Merseyside derby games, Everton's hopes of European football were let down by a poor run of form on their home ground, securing just six wins compared to eleven on the road, ending their season in a disappointing tenth. In what ended up being Nuno Espirito Santo's last season as head coach, Wolverhampton Wanderers endured what ended up being a less successful campaign than their previous two, the loss of star striker Raúl Jiménez to a freak accident in a win at Arsenal contributed to the Black Country club falling down the table after a decent start and only avoiding a relegation scrap because of the poor form of the teams below them. In what also ended up being Roy Hodgson's final season as their manager, Crystal Palace also comfortably avoided the drop, extending their record run of top-flight seasons to nine in a row for the next campaign.

At the bottom of the table, all three relegated teams ended up occupying the spots with at least three games to go, and for the first time since the introduction of three points for a win in the top-flight, none of the relegated sides broke the 30-point barrier. Just one season after breaking into the top ten, Sheffield United endured one of the worst seasons in their history, breaking many unwanted records and equalling the record for the most losses in a Premier League season and the lowest goals scored in a 38-game season, though a series of wins in the second  half of the campaign meant they ended up with a points total that, while still poor, was far from the worst in Premier League history. West Bromwich Albion finished above them, the controversial decision to sack manager Slaven Bilić in December in favour of Sam Allardyce going against the Baggies, the former England manager suffering only his second relegation in his managerial history (and his first since 1997), as they fell back into the Championship after a single season. Also returning to the second tier after one season was Fulham; despite enjoying a much better campaign defensively and securing some impressive wins, the London club's hopes were ultimately let down by a lack of goals (including just nine scored at Craven Cottage) and a high number of draws, making it the fourth season in a row where they moved between the Premier League and the Championship.

Championship 

Having been relegated on a whimper the previous year, Norwich City responded in emphatic style, securing both an immediate return to the Premier League and their second Championship title in three campaigns – whilst ultimately finishing with a lower goal record compared to other seasons, despite Finnish striker Teemu Pukki recording another superb goal haul, the Canaries enjoyed a rare and much-improved season in defence. Finishing second were Watford, who overcame yet another mid-season managerial change (their sixth in just over a year) to join the Canaries in returning to the top-flight after one season, a superb run of form in 2021 earning Spanish head coach Xisco Munoz promotion on top of the Hornets also having their own impressive defence, conceding the least number of goals for any second-tier team since losing play-off finalists Preston North End in 2006. Taking the final spot through the playoffs by beating Swansea City - and ending a barren run of nine playoff campaigns across their history without success - were Brentford, who made amends for their narrow final loss the previous year and secured promotion to the Premier League for the first time, their win also sending the Bees back into the top-flight for the first time in 74 years; in addition, in a first for English football, all three promoted managers from any of the Football League divisions came from outside the British Isles.

Despite ultimately losing out in the playoff semi-finals, Barnsley were undoubtedly the surprise package of the campaign; having looked likely to battle relegation yet again at the end of October and then seeing their head coach depart for America, the appointment of unknown French manager Valérien Ismaël saw the Tykes rocket up the table - with some impressive results along the way to boot - and comfortably secure 5th place. After having battled against relegation since losing in the play-off final in 2017, Reading enjoyed a much improved season under Serbian head coach Veljko Paunović, only missing out on promotion owing to several bouts of indifferent form throughout the season that the teams above them took advantage of. Despite hovering above the relegation zone for much of the season, Coventry City managed to pull themselves over the line in their first season in the second tier since 2012, a good run of results in the closing months of the campaign pushing them firmly into mid-table - whilst the Sky Blues also received some good news off-pitch, managing to secure a new contract to return to their home stadium of the Ricoh Arena after two seasons away.

For the second reason running, the battle to avoid relegation saw all three places left wide open going into the last round of games – taking bottom place in the closing minutes of the season were Sheffield Wednesday, who fought valiantly to avoid the drop, only for the points deduction (twelve later reduced to six on appeal) for breaching financial rules imposed prior to the start of the season result in survival falling out of their reach, sending the Yorkshire club back into the third tier after a nine-year absence. Rotherham United finished second-bottom, and were relegated straight back to League One, making this the fifth successive season in which they swapped between the two divisions; despite ending up as statistically the worst team in the division, they managed to keep themselves in contention for survival – mostly because of having a multitude of games in hand as a result of two COVID-19 outbreaks – and would actually have survived had they not conceded an 88th-minute equaliser in their final match. Despite having what proved to be a spirited first season in the Championship, Wycombe Wanderers endured an immediate relegation back to League One, their chances ultimately being undone by a dreadful start that saw them lose their first seven games of the campaign, but at least staving off relegation until the last day of the season. Derby County, who struggled all season despite the appointment of Wayne Rooney as manager in November, would also have been relegated if not for Wednesday's points deduction; they did secure survival on the final day by holding Wednesday to a draw, albeit the result would have relegated them both without Rotherham conceding a late equaliser.

League One 

Playing in the third tier for the first time since 2005, Hull City made amends for their dramatic collapse in form and consequent relegation the previous season, this time being in the top two for almost the entire campaign and ultimately emerging as champions. Peterborough United finished as runners-up, making this the third time that manager Darren Ferguson had taken the club into the Championship, and his fourth promotion with the club overall; whilst a number of poor results nearly went against them, the Posh successfully achieved promotion in a 3–3 draw with Lincoln City. Taking the final promotion via the playoffs and ending a six-year exile from the second tier were Blackpool, who marked the end of their first full season under manager Neil Critchley in spectacular fashion; despite making a slow start to the campaign, the Seasiders rocketed up the table and solidified themselves in the top six, coming from behind to beat Lincoln City in the final.

Whilst ultimately missing out on promotion yet again, Sunderland did at least secure some success in their third consecutive League One season by winning their first EFL Trophy - whilst also gaining new ownership in the process, in the form of 24 year old businessman Kyril Louis-Dreyfus. A very poor start to the campaign for Burton Albion saw the Brewers pulled into a relegation battle, a battle which was won with games to spare following the return of influential manager Jimmy Floyd Hasselbaink for a second spell as manager. Wigan Athletic endured what proved to be yet another turbulent season both on and off the pitch, battling both a potential second successive relegation (and a potential fourth in seven seasons) and an uncertain future; however, a superb run of form late in the season that coincided with the Latics managing to find new ownership helped save the club from the drop.

Bristol Rovers finished bottom and returned to League Two for the first time in five years, with three different managers all trying and failing to improve the club's fortunes during the season. Swindon Town's season rapidly fell apart after promotion-winning manager Richie Wellens moved to Salford City early in the campaign, finishing the season with both the most defeats and the worst defence in the division as they suffered immediate relegation back to League Two; fellow newly promoted side Northampton Town joined them in immediate relegation, ultimately being cost dear by a terrible run of form in the winter. Rochdale occupied the fourth and final relegation spot, bringing an end to their longest spell to date in the third tier and finally enduring the relegation they had battled against in previous seasons.

League Two 

In a campaign marked with constant change among the top three, Cheltenham Town secured promotion back to League One for the first time since 2009, having stayed in the promotion race for nearly the entire season before edging back into the top three in late February, never once leaving it. The battle for both the remaining automatic promotion places and the playoff spots ended up going to the final day, with eight different clubs battling it out – but ultimately taking second and third place were Cambridge United and Bolton Wanderers; despite a poor run of form in December, promotion had never looked unlikely for Cambridge United, the U's securing promotion to the third tier for the first time since 2002, giving manager Mark Bonner his first promotion of his managerial career. Having spent the majority of the season looking likely to battle a third successive relegation, a surge in form in 2021 saw Bolton Wanderers rocket up the table and sneak into third place, securing an immediate return to League One and giving hope for a revival in form for the Greater Manchester club after years of struggle on and off the field. Winning the play-off final, and thereby securing promotion to the third tier for the first time in their history was Morecambe; a remarkable achievement considering their consistent battles against relegation in the previous seasons (which had seen them only escape relegation the previous season due to the demise of both Bury and Macclesfield Town), seeing off Newport County via a controversial penalty in extra time.

In their first ever Football League season, Harrogate Town defied all expectations and achieved safety with a number of games to spare – whilst inconsistent form prevented the Yorkshire side from challenging for promotion, they were never in any serious danger of an immediate return to non-league football. Barrow's first Football League season for 48 years saw the North West club ultimately secure survival against all odds – whilst first hit by the loss of influential manager Ian Evatt to Bolton Wanderers and then sacking two different managers before the end of February with results and form looking bleak, the club managed to pull themselves over the line thanks in part to caretaker manager Rob Kelly, who oversaw 10 of the Bluebirds' 13 wins in both his caretaker spells.

At the other end of the table, Grimsby Town endured a season full of struggle on and off the pitch that ultimately culminated in relegation – with even the return of manager Paul Hurst, who had overseen their return to the Football League in 2016, failing to help the Lincolnshire club escape the drop. Finishing just above them were Southend United, who suffered their second consecutive relegation and fell out of the Football League for the first time in their history, a run of just one win in their opening 15 games on top of an inability to score (their total of 29 goals being the lowest scored by anyone in a 24-team division since 1982) ended up setting the tone for the Essex club's hopes and in similar circumstances to Grimsby, the return of former manager Phil Brown late in the season proved to be too late to save the Shrimpers from losing their 101-year Football League status.

National League 

In a season marked with different teams taking top spot across the season, as well as postponement, delays and expunged results off the field, Sutton United finished top in their penultimate game and secured promotion to the Football League for the first time in their 123-year history, despite playing effectively with no fans all season. Taking the final battle through the play-offs, in a fight that went all the way to penalties in the final at Ashton Gate, were Hartlepool United, who reversed a run of three bottom-half finishes since falling out of the Football League in 2017 and ended manager Dave Challinor's first full season as Pools manager in superb fashion.

Mounting financial problems finally took its toll on Macclesfield Town, who were expelled from the National League and then finally wound up in the High Court before the campaign even began – the only positive coming late in the season, with the assets being rebranded as Macclesfield FC and the new club being given the go-ahead to enter the tenth tier for next season. Dover Athletic also encountered financial problems, which resulted in the team refusing to play due to a lack of promised funding and their results expunged for the season, on top of a points deduction being imposed at the start of the next campaign. As a result of the National League electing to declare the sixth tier null and void, no teams were relegated or promoted between the fifth and sixth tiers; a combination of all these factors proved beneficial for King's Lynn Town and Barnet, who were at threat of being cut adrift at the bottom of the table with the most losses and the worst defences in the division, ensuring fifth tier status for both clubs for next season.

League play-offs

Football League play-offs

EFL Championship

Final

EFL League One

Final

EFL League Two

Final

National League play-offs

National League

Final

Cup competitions

FA Cup

Final

EFL Cup

Final

Community Shield

EFL Trophy

2020 Final

2020–21

Final

FA Trophy

2020 Final

2020–21

Final

Women's football

FA Women's Super League

FA Women's Championship

FA Women's National League

On 5 June 2020, all results were expunged from the 2019–20 FA Women's National League with no teams being promoted or relegated for the 2020–21 season.

Cup competitions

FA Women's Cup

2019–20 Final

The final was played at Wembley Stadium on Saturday 1 November 2020.

2020–21

Final
The final was played at Wembley Stadium on Sunday 5 December 2021.

FA Women's League Cup

Final

Women's FA Community Shield

Managerial changes 
This is a list of changes of managers within English league football:

New clubs
Bury A.F.C.
F.C. Isle of Man

Clubs removed
 Bury
 Macclesfield Town

Deaths
 10 July 2020: Jack Charlton , 85, England World Cup winner, who played as a defender for Leeds United and also managed Middlesbrough, Sheffield Wednesday and Newcastle United.
 13 July 2020: Pat Quinn, 84, Scotland and Blackpool inside forward.
 17 July 2020: Alex Dawson, 80, Manchester United, Preston North End, Bury, Brighton & Hove Albion and Brentford forward.
 23 July 2020: Alan Garner, 69, Millwall, Luton Town, Watford and Portsmouth defender.
 28 July 2020: Gerry Harris, 84, Wolverhampton Wanderers and Walsall left back.
 29 July 2020: Don Townsend, 89, Charlton Athletic and Crystal Palace left back.
 2 August 2020: Keith Pontin, 64, Wales and Cardiff City defender.
 3 August 2020: Ernie Phythian, 78, Bolton Wanderers, Wrexham and Hartlepools United forward.
 c. 7 August 2020: Stuart Metcalfe, 69, Blackburn Rovers, Carlisle United and Crewe Alexandra midfielder.
 11 August 2020: Mike Tindall, 79, Aston Villa and Walsall midfielder.
 13 August 2020: Colin Parry, 79, Stockport County and Rochdale defender.
 13 August 2020: Jackie Wren, 84, Rotherham United goalkeeper.
 14 August 2020: John Talbut, 79, Burnley and West Bromwich Albion centre half.
 16 August 2020: Danny Campbell, 76, West Bromwich Albion, Stockport County and Bradford Park Avenue defender.
 16 August 2020: Tommy Carroll, 77, Republic of Ireland, Ipswich Town and Birmingham City defender.
 16 August 2020: Malcolm Manley, 70, Leicester City and Portsmouth centre half.
 16 August 2020: Alan Welsh, 73, Millwall, Torquay United, Plymouth Argyle and A.F.C. Bournemouth winger.
 2 September 2020: Albert Cheesebrough, 85, Burnley, Leicester City, Port Vale and Mansfield Town forward.
 2 September 2020: Fred Davies, 81, Wolverhampton Wanderers, Cardiff City and A.F.C. Bournemouth goalkeeper, who also managed Shrewsbury Town.
 9 September 2020: Tony Villars, 68, Wales, Cardiff City and Newport County winger.
 17 September 2020: Reg Harrison, 97, Derby County winger.
 19 September 2020: John Quinn, 82, Sheffield Wednesday, Rotherham United and Halifax Town utility player.
 20 September 2020: Keith Jobling, 86, Grimsby Town centre half.
 21 September 2020: Brian Peterson, 83, Blackpool forward.
 25 September 2020: Peter Hampton, 66, Leeds United, Stoke City, Burnley, Rochdale and Carlisle United left back.
 1 October 2020: Barry Mahy, 78, USA and Scunthorpe United defender.
 5 October 2020: Wayne Williams, 56, Shrewsbury Town, Northampton Town and Walsall defender.
 c. 5 October 2020: Bob Wilson, 77, Aston Villa, Cardiff City and Exeter City goalkeeper.
 8 October 2020: Sam Burton, 93, Swindon Town goalkeeper.
 8 October 2020: Tommy Robson, 76, Northampton Town, Chelsea, Newcastle United and Peterborough United winger.
 11 October 2020: Richie Barker, 80, Derby County, Notts County and Peterborough United forward, who also managed Shrewsbury Town, Stoke City and Notts County.
 17 October 2020: Alan Bradshaw, 79, Blackburn Rovers and Crewe Alexandra midfielder.
 19 October 2020: Jim Townsend, 75, Middlesbrough midfielder
 21 October 2020: Gordon Astall, 93, England, Plymouth Argyle, Birmingham City and Torquay United outside right.
 27 October 2020: Hugh Morrow, 90, West Bromwich Albion and Northampton Town winger.
 30 October 2020: Nobby Stiles , 78, England World Cup winner, who played as a defensive midfielder for Manchester United, Middlesbrough and Preston North End, as well as a manager of Preston North End and West Bromwich Albion.
 31 October 2020: Marius Žaliūkas, 36, Lithuania and Leeds United defender.
 4 November 2020: Matt Tees, 81, Grimsby Town, Charlton Athletic and Luton Town forward.
 5 November 2020: Brian O'Donnell, 63, A.F.C. Bournemouth and Torquay United defender.
 6 November 2020: Harry Holman, 62, Exeter City and Peterborough United forward.
 9 November 2020: Doug Wragg, 86, West Ham United, Mansfield Town, Rochdale and Chesterfield winger.
 10 November 2020: Tony Waiters, 83, England, Blackpool and Burnley goalkeeper, who also managed Plymouth Argyle.
 11 November 2020: Les Massie, 85, Huddersfield Town, Darlington, Halifax Town, Bradford Park Avenue and Workington inside forward.
 12 November 2020: Albert Quixall, 87, England, Sheffield Wednesday, Manchester United, Oldham Athletic and Stockport County inside forward.
 13 November 2020: Gwyn Jones, 85, Wolverhampton Wanderers and Bristol Rovers defender.
 15 November 2020: Ray Clemence , 72, England, Scunthorpe United, Liverpool and Tottenham Hotspur goalkeeper, who also managed Tottenham Hotspur and Barnet.
 15 November 2020: Campbell Forsyth, 86, Scotland and Southampton goalkeeper.
 17 November 2020: John Poole, 87, Port Vale goalkeeper.
 18 November 2020: Adam Musial, 71, Hereford United defender.
 19 November 2020: Stan Trafford, 74, Port Vale forward.
 c. 19 November 2020: Kevin Charlton, 66, A.F.C. Bournemouth, Hereford United and Scarborough goalkeeper.
 21 November 2020: John Rowland, 79, Nottingham Forest, Port Vale, Mansfield Town and Tranmere Rovers forward.
 23 November 2020: Maurice Setters, 83, Exeter City, West Bromwich Albion, Manchester United, Stoke City, Coventry City and Charlton Athletic wing half, who also managed Doncaster Rovers.
 29 November 2020: Papa Bouba Diop, 42, Senegal, Fulham, Portsmouth, West Ham United and Birmingham City midfielder.
 3 December 2020: Bill Holmes, 94, Doncaster Rovers, Blackburn Rovers and Bradford City striker.
 4 December 2020: Jimmy Fletcher, 89, Gillingham striker.
 8 December 2020: Alejandro Sabella, 66, Argentina, Sheffield United and Leeds United midfielder.
 14 December 2020: Gérard Houllier , 73, Liverpool and Aston Villa manager.
 14 December 2020: John McSeveney, 89, Sunderland, Cardiff City, Newport County and Hull City winger, who also managed Barnsley
 14 December 2020: George Sharples, 77, Everton, Blackburn Rovers and Southport wing half.
 c. 18 December 2020: Steve Ingle, 74, Bradford City, Southend United, Wrexham, Stockport County, Southport and Darlington right back.
 21 December 2020: John Fitzpatrick, 74, Manchester United full back/wing half.
 23 December 2020: Eddie McLaren, 91, Reading right back/wing half.
 24 December 2020: Davie Sneddon , 84, Preston North End inside forward
 26 December 2020: Mike Sutton, 76, Norwich City, Chester and Carlisle United midfielder.
 27 December 2020: Eddie Moss, 81, Southport inside forward.
 28 December 2020: Tom Docherty, 96, Lincoln City, Reading, Norwich City and Newport County winger
 28 December 2020: George Hudson, 83, Accrington Stanley, Peterborough United, Coventry City, Northampton Town and Tranmere Rovers forward.
 28 December 2020: Colin Withers, 80, Birmingham City, Aston Villa and Lincoln City goalkeeper.
 31 December 2020: Tommy Docherty, 92, Preston North End, Arsenal and Chelsea right half, who also managed Chelsea, Rotherham United, Queens Park Rangers, Aston Villa, Manchester United, Derby County, Preston North End and Wolverhampton Wanderers.
 1 January 2021: Clint Boulton, 72, Port Vale and Torquay United defender.
 5 January 2021: Colin Bell , 74, England, Bury and Manchester City midfielder.
 10 January 2021: Tosh Chamberlain, 86, Fulham forward.
 10 January 2021: Tony Gregory, 83, Luton Town and Watford wing half.
 10 January 2021: Bobby Kellard, 77, Southend United, Crystal Palace, Ipswich Town, Portsmouth, Bristol City, Leicester City and Torquay United midfielder.
 15 January 2021: Geoff Barnett, 74, Everton and Arsenal goalkeeper.
 c. 20 January 2021: John Jeffers, 52, Port Vale and Stockport County winger.
 20 January 2021: Malcolm Slater, 82, Southend United and Leyton Orient winger.
 21 January 2021: Peter Swan, 84, England, Sheffield Wednesday and Bury defender.
 22 January 2021: Luton Shelton, 35, Jamaica and Sheffield United forward.
 c. 22 January 2021: Johnny Williams, 73, Watford and Colchester United left back.
 23 January 2021: Peter Gillott, 85, Barnsley full back.
 24 January 2021: Barrie Mitchell, 73, Tranmere Rovers, Preston North End and York City forward.
 24 January 2021: Ron Rafferty, 86, Portsmouth, Grimsby Town, Hull City and Aldershot forward.
 26 January 2021: John Mortimore, 86, Chelsea and Queens Park Rangers centre half, who also managed Portsmouth.
 26 January 2021: Dr. Jozef Vengloš, 84, Aston Villa manager.
 28 January 2021: Eddie Connachan, 85, Scotland and Middlesbrough goalkeeper.
 31 January 2021: John Gibbons, 95, Queens Park Rangers and Ipswich Town forward.
 1 February 2021: Peter Hindley, 76, Nottingham Forest, Coventry City and Peterborough United right back.
 4 February 2021: Ben Hannigan, 77, Wrexham inside forward
 6 February 2021: Ken Roberts, 84, Wrexham and Aston Villa winger, who also managed Chester.
 c. 7 February 2021: Whelan Ward, 91, Bradford City and Bradford Park Avenue striker.
 8 February 2021: Tony Collins, 94, York City, Watford, Norwich City, Torquay United, Crystal Palace and Rochdale winger, who also managed Rochdale and was the first black manager to manage in the English Football League.
 8 February 2021: Graham Day, 67, Bristol Rovers defender.
 10 February 2021: Dai Davies, 72, Wales, Swansea City, Everton, Wrexham and Tranmere Rovers goalkeeper.
 c. 11 February 2021: John James, 72, Port Vale, Chester and Tranmere Rovers striker.
 11 February 2021: John Kirkham, 79, Wolverhampton Wanderers, Peterborough United and Exeter City wing half.
 12 February 2021: Norman Jukes, 88, York City defender.
 12 February 2021: Alan Woan, 90, Norwich City, Northampton Town, Crystal Palace and Aldershot inside forward.
 17 February 2021: John Manning, 80, Tranmere Rovers, Shrewsbury Town, Norwich City, Bolton Wanderers, Walsall, Crewe Alexandra and Barnsley forward.
 22 February 2021: Jack Bolton, 79, Ipswich Town defender.
 28 February 2021: Glenn Roeder, 65, Leyton Orient, Queens Park Rangers, Newcastle United, Watford and Gillingham defender, who also managed Gillingham, Watford, West Ham United, Newcastle United and Norwich City.
 1 March 2021: Ian St John, 82, Scotland, Liverpool, Coventry City and Tranmere Rovers forward, who also managed Portsmouth.
 4 March 2021: Phil Chisnall, 78, Manchester United, Liverpool, Southend United and Stockport County forward.
 4 March 2021: Willie Whigham, 81, Middlesbrough goalkeeper.
 5 March 2021: Mickey Lewis, 56, West Bromwich Albion, Derby County and Oxford United midfielder.
 9 March 2021: Micky Brown, 76, Fulham, Millwall, Luton Town and Colchester United forward.
 9 March 2021: Bob Graves, 78, Lincoln City goalkeeper.
 11 March 2021: Ron Phoenix, 91, Manchester City and Rochdale wing half.
 c. 11 March 2021: Jimmy Stevenson, 74, Southend United left half.
 17 March 2021: Steve Jagielka, 43, Shrewsbury Town midfielder.
 20 March 2021: Peter Lorimer, 74, Scotland, Leeds United and York City midfielder, who is Leeds United's record goalscorer.
 21 March 2021: Terry Melling, 81, Watford, Newport County, Mansfield Town, Rochdale and Darlington forward.
 22 March 2021: Alan Slough, 73, Luton Town, Fulham, Peterborough United and Millwall midfielder.
 22 March 2021: Frank Worthington, 72, England, Huddersfield Town, Leicester City, Bolton Wanderers, Birmingham City, Leeds United, Sunderland, Southampton, Brighton & Hove Albion, Tranmere Rovers, Preston North End and Stockport County forward, who also managed Tranmere Rovers.
 23 March 2021: Len Fletcher, 91, Ipswich Town wing half.
 24 March 2021: Derek Hawksworth, 94, Bradford City, Sheffield United, Huddersfield Town and Lincoln City winger.
 27 March 2021: Derek Ufton, 92, England and Charlton Athletic defender, who also managed Plymouth Argyle.
 31 March 2021: Lee Collins, 32, Port Vale, Barnsley, Northampton Town Mansfield Town and Forest Green Rovers defender, who was still playing for Yeovil Town at the time of his death.
 7 April 2021: Doug Holden, 90, England, Bolton Wanderers and Preston North End winger.
 11 April 2021: Colin Baker, 86, Wales and Cardiff City wing half.
 12 April 2021: Peter Goy, 82, Arsenal, Southend United, Watford and Huddersfield Town goalkeeper.
 17 April 2021: Wayne Talkes, 68, Southampton and A.F.C. Bournemouth midfielder.
 24 April 2021: Walter Borthwick, 73, Brighton & Hove Albion midfielder.
 26 April 2021: Peter Gelson, 79, Brentford defender.
 26 April 2021: Ian Hamilton, 80, Bristol Rovers and Newport County inside forward.
 28 April 2021: Steve Perks, 58, Shrewsbury Town goalkeeper.
 29 April 2021: Zhang Enhua, 48, China and Grimsby Town defender.
 4 May 2021: Frank Brogan, 78, Ipswich Town and Halifax Town winger.
 4 May 2021: Steve Conroy, 64, Sheffield United, Rotherham United and Rochdale goalkeeper.
 4 May 2021: Alan McLoughlin, 54, Republic of Ireland, Swindon Town, Southampton, Portsmouth, Wigan Athletic and Rochdale midfielder.
 9 May 2021: James Dean, 35, Bury striker.
 20 May 2020: Len Badger, 75, Sheffield United and Chesterfield defender.
 20 May 2020: Chris Chilton, 77, Hull City and Coventry City striker, who holds the record for the most goals scored by a Hull City player.
 20 May 2021: Eric Winstanley, 76, Barnsley and Chesterfield defender.
 31 May 2021: Colin Appleton, 85, Leicester City, Charlton Athletic and Barrow defender, who also managed Barrow, Hull City, Swansea City and Exeter City.

Retirements
 1 July 2020: Will Buckley, 30, former Rochdale, Watford, Brighton & Hove Albion, Sunderland, Leeds United, Birmingham City, Sheffield Wednesday, and Bolton Wanderers winger
 1 July 2020: Michael Raynes, 32, former Stockport County, Scunthorpe United, Rotherham United, Oxford United, Carlisle United and Crewe Alexandra defender.
 8 July 2020: Bobby Olejnik, 33, former Torquay United, Peterborough United, Scunthorpe United, York City, Exeter City and Mansfield Town goalkeeper.
 12 July 2020: Mile Jedinak, 35, former Australia, Crystal Palace and Aston Villa midfielder.
 13 July 2020: Federico Bessone, 36, former Swansea City, Leeds United, Charlton Athletic, Swindon Town and Millwall defender.
 14 July 2020: Matt Mills, 34, former Southampton, Manchester City, Doncaster Rovers, Reading, Leicester City, Bolton Wanderers, Nottingham Forest, Barnsley and Forest Green Rovers defender.
 17 July 2020: André Schürrle, 29, Germany World Cup winner and former Chelsea and Fulham attacking midfielder.
 21 July 2020: Jamie Mackie, 34, former Scotland, Wimbledon, MK Dons, Plymouth Argyle, Queens Park Rangers, Nottingham Forest, Reading and Oxford United forward.
 26 July 2020: Leighton Baines, 35, former England, Wigan Athletic and Everton defender.
 12 August 2020: Stephan Lichtsteiner, 36, former Switzerland and Arsenal defender.
 14 August 2020: Lee Cattermole, 32, former Middlesbrough, Wigan Athletic and Sunderland midfielder.
 21 August 2020: Ali Al-Habsi, 38, former Oman, Bolton Wanderers, Wigan Athletic and Reading goalkeeper.
 21 August 2020: Neal Bishop, 39, former Barnet, Notts County, Blackpool, Scunthorpe United and Mansfield Town midfielder.
 27 August 2020: Gareth Barry, 39, former England, Aston Villa, Manchester City, Everton and West Bromwich Albion midfielder.
 13 September 2020: Lloyd Dyer, 38, former West Bromwich Albion, Millwall, Milton Keynes Dons, Leicester City, Watford, Burnley, Burton Albion and Bolton Wanderers winger.
 16 October 2020: Pablo Zabaleta, 35, former Argentina, Manchester City and West Ham United defender.
 17 October 2020: James Collins, 37, former Wales, Cardiff City, West Ham United, Aston Villa and Ipswich Town defender.
 26 October 2020: Michel Vorm, 37, former Netherlands, Swansea City and Tottenham Hotspur goalkeeper.
 15 November 2020: Javier Mascherano, 36, former Argentina, West Ham United and Liverpool midfielder.
 17 November 2020: Darren Potter, 35, former Republic of Ireland, Liverpool, Wolverhampton Wanderers, Sheffield Wednesday, Milton Keynes Dons, Rotherham United and Tranmere Rovers midfielder.
 23 November 2020: Alex Bruce, 36, former Republic of Ireland, Northern Ireland, Birmingham City, Ipswich Town, Leeds United, Hull City, Bury and Wigan Athletic defender.
 24 November 2020: Marcin Wasilewski, 40, former Poland and Leicester City defender.
 1 December 2020: Jabo Ibehre, 37, former Leyton Orient, Walsall, Milton Keynes Dons, Colchester United, Carlisle United and Cambridge United forward.
 2 December 2020: Aaron Wilbraham, 41, former Stockport County, Hull City, Milton Keynes Dons, Norwich City, Crystal Palace, Bristol City, Bolton Wanderers and Rochdale forward.
 15 January 2021: Wayne Rooney, 35, former England, Everton, Manchester United and Derby County forward.
 26 January 2021: Ashley Williams, 36, former Wales, Stockport County, Swansea City, Everton and Bristol City defender.
 4 February 2021: Danny Graham, 35, former Middlesbrough, Carlisle United, Watford, Swansea City, Sunderland and Blackburn Rovers striker.
 10 February 2021: Ron Vlaar, 35, former Netherlands and Aston Villa defender.
 18 February 2021: Bobby Copping, 19, former Peterborough United defender.
 19 February 2021: Yohan Cabaye, 35, former France, Newcastle United and Crystal Palace midfielder.
 27 February 2021: Luke Hyam, 29, former Ipswich Town and Southend United midfielder.
 1 March 2021: Nikica Jelavić, 35, former Croatia, Everton, Hull City and West Ham United forward.
 24 March 2021: Lewis Hardcastle, 22, former Barrow midfielder.
 20 April 2021: Àngel Rangel, 38, former Swansea City and Queens Park Rangers right back.
 1 May 2021: Sam Togwell, 36, former Scunthorpe United, Barnet, Barnsley and Chesterfield defensive midfielder.
 6 May 2021: Gary Sawyer, 35, former Plymouth Argyle, Bristol Rovers and Leyton Orient defender.
 8 May 2021: Romain Vincelot, 35, former Dagenham & Redbridge, Brighton & Hove Albion, Leyton Orient, Coventry City, Bradford City, Crawley Town, Shrewsbury Town and Stevenage midfielder.
 8 May 2021: Jon Stead, 38, former Huddersfield Town, Blackburn Rovers, Sunderland, Sheffield United, Ipswich Town, Bristol City, Notts County and Harrogate Town striker.
 8 May 2021: Scott Golbourne, 33, former Bristol City, Reading, Exeter City, Barnsley, Wolverhampton Wanderers and Shrewsbury Town defender.
 9 May 2021: Jobi McAnuff, 39, former Jamaica, Wimbledon, West Ham United, Cardiff City, Crystal Palace, Watford, Reading, Leyton Orient and Stevenage midfielder.
 10 May 2021: Mark Tyler, 44, former Peterborough United and Luton Town goalkeeper.
 10 May 2021: Paul Gallagher, 36, former Scotland, Blackburn Rovers, Leicester City and Preston North End midfielder.
 12 May 2021: Antonio Valencia, 35, former Ecuador, Wigan Athletic and Manchester United winger/wing-back.
 17 May 2021: Vedran Ćorluka, 35, former Croatia, Manchester City and Tottenham Hotspur defender.
 21 May 2021: Wes Morgan, 37, former Jamaica, Nottingham Forest and Leicester City defender.
 27 May 2021: Jimmy Smith, 34, former Chelsea, Leyton Orient, Stevenage and Crawley Town midfielder.
 27 May 2021: James Vaughan, 32, former Everton, Norwich City, Huddersfield Town, Birmingham City, Bury, Sunderland, Wigan Athletic, Bradford City and Tranmere Rovers forward.
 31 May 2021: Glenn Murray, 37, former Carlisle United, Rochdale, Brighton & Hove Albion, Crystal Palace, A.F.C. Bournemouth and Nottingham Forest striker.

Diary of the season

 30 September 2020: The first month of the condensed football season ends with Leicester City, Liverpool, and Everton leading the Premier League, all winning their three games played so far. Aston Villa, Arsenal, Crystal Palace, and Leeds United have all also made good starts with six points from the first three matches. Burnley, Sheffield United, and Fulham (the only clubs without points so far) made up the bottom three. Reading and Bristol City are setting the early pace in the Championship with a full nine points each, followed by Swansea City, Bournemouth, and Watford on seven, and Blackburn Rovers in sixth due to a +8 goal difference at this early juncture. The third relegated club, Norwich City, finish September in midtable. Nottingham Forest, who missed the playoffs on the final day of the previous season, only avoid finishing the first month of the new season in the relegation zone due to Sheffield Wednesday's 12-point deduction. Wednesday finish September on -8 points, joined in the relegation zone by Derby County (22nd) and newly promoted Wycombe Wanderers.
 31 October 2020: October ends with Liverpool on top of the table, three points ahead of Everton (who have a game in hand) and Wolverhampton Wanderers. Chelsea, Aston Villa, Leicester and Tottenham Hotspur hold fourth through to seventh, while Sheffield United, Fulham, and Burnley remain in the relegation zone (their only changes in position coming about from changes in goal difference). Reading continue their good start in the Championship with a four-point lead on second-placed Swansea. Bournemouth, Norwich, and Watford continue to make headway on their campaigns to immediately return to the Premier League and stand third, fourth, and sixth respectively (Middlesbrough are fifth). Sheffield Wednesday remain on a negative points tally, and Derby and Wycombe continue to occupy the basement of the second tier.
 30 November 2020: Tottenham take the lead over Liverpool at the top of the table as November ends, albeit only on goal difference. However, with a quarter of the season played the Premier League table still shows congestion, with two points separating Chelsea, Leicester, West Ham United, Southampton and Wolves in the top seven, and six separating Chelsea from 15th-placed Crystal Palace. Sheffield United, the only club in the top four divisions without a league win so far, are firmly rooted to the foot of the table. Fulham have climbed out of the relegation zone at the expense of West Bromwich Albion; Burnley are 19th. The three sides relegated to the Championship last season continue to lead the way in the Championship, occupying the top three positions. Swansea and Reading are level with third-placed Watford on points, and Bristol City are sixth. Sheffield Wednesday are now 23rd after their points deduction was cut to 6 points, replaced at the bottom by Derby, while Wycombe remains in the relegation zone despite some good recent form.
 31 December 2020: For the third year running Liverpool finish the year top of the table, three points ahead of arch-rivals Manchester United having played a game more. The race for European football remains hotly contested with Leicester and Everton finishing 2020 in the top four and Aston Villa, Chelsea, Tottenham, Manchester City and Southampton all tied on 26 points. Sheffield United remain bottom with the worst-ever start to a Premier League season - 2 points from 16 matches. West Brom have dropped to 19th, prompting the sacking of Slaven Bilic in favour of Premier League veteran Sam Allardyce. Fulham are back in the relegation zone but have a game in hand over their nearest rivals, Brighton & Hove Albion. Norwich have climbed to the Championship summit, three points ahead of EFL Cup semi-finalists Brentford. Swansea consolidate third place, with them and Reading sandwiching Bournemouth and Watford, although the two relegated sides have a game in hand over their rivals. Derby have experienced a resurgence under former England international Wayne Rooney and finish December in 20th. Wycombe are now bottom. Sheffield Wednesday remain in the bottom three but have ceded 23rd place to Rotherham United, who have two games in hand over their Yorkshire neighbours due to postponements following a Covid outbreak.
 31 January 2021: A resurgent Manchester City finish January on top of the Premier League, having won all 9 games they played that month. Manchester United remain three points behind of the leaders in second, though City have the game in hand. A poor January that has seen the end of their 68-match unbeaten run at home sees Liverpool finish the month in third. Leicester drop to fourth, West Ham continue their unexpected run for European football to finish January fifth, and Spurs, Chelsea, and Everton are tied on 33 points to hold sixth through to eighth. The relegation zone remains unchanged from December despite Sheffield United picking up their first two league victories of the season, with Fulham 7 points adrift of 17th-placed Brighton. In the Championship, Norwich extend their lead to four points, with Swansea and Brentford swapping places from the end of 2020. Watford, Reading, and Bournemouth remain in the Championship top six (in that order), as do Rotherham (22nd), Sheffield Wednesday (23rd), and Wycombe (24th) in the bottom three.
 28 February 2021: Manchester City have extended their lead at the top of the Premier League to 12 points, having extended their winning run in all competitions to 20 games. Manchester United remain second, while Liverpool's poor form has seen Leicester, West Ham and Chelsea leapfrog them in the chase for Champions League football, with seventh-placed Everton also having a chance of jumping ahead of their Merseyside rivals if they win their two games in hand. Fulham, West Brom and Sheffield United remain in the relegation zone, but Fulham are now only 3 points behind Brighton and Newcastle United. Meanwhile, Norwich's lead in the Championship has been extended to 7 points, with Brentford taking back second place. Watford, Swansea (with two games in hand on their promotion rivals), Reading and Bournemouth remain in the top six, although Barnsley (who only avoided relegation the previous season with an injury-time goal in their final match) are only a point behind Bournemouth with a game in hand. The Championship relegation zone remains unchanged, but Rotherham hold two games in hand on relegation rivals Coventry City and Birmingham City.
 31 March 2021: Manchester City continue to extend their Premier League lead, standing 14 points ahead of Manchester United despite having their winning run ended by their city rivals. Leicester remain third, Chelsea and West Ham end the month exchanging their positions from February, and Liverpool have dropped to seventh, below Spurs. The relegation zone is unchanged, though Brighton have begun to pull away from the drop zone, leaving Fulham and Newcastle to fight for 17th. In the Championship, Norwich's lead has been slightly increased to 8 points despite the resurgence of second-placed Watford, but more importantly they are 14 points clear of Swansea, who have 27 left to play for. Brentford have dropped to fourth, while Barnsley have climbed to fifth, knocking Reading and Bournemouth down a place each. For the fourth consecutive month Wycombe, Sheffield Wednesday, and Rotherham hold the bottom three spots, but with Rotherham's multiple games in hand Coventry, Birmingham, and Derby are by no means out of the woods.
 30 April 2021: Manchester City are on the brink of their fifth Premier League title, standing 10 points ahead of Manchester United with only 5 games remaining. Leicester remain third with a 6-point lead over fourth-placed Chelsea who have a game in hand over them. West Ham remain fifth, three points behind Chelsea in the chase for a Champions League place. Liverpool and Spurs exchange their positions from March. The relegation zone in unchanged, though a resurgent Newcastle side are now 9 points clear of relegation places. Fulham and West Brom chances of staying are slim at this point, needing a highly unlikely turnaround in their last five games to have any chance of surviving. In the Championship, Norwich and Watford have been promoted to the Premier League after a single season at this level, with Norwich needing just another win to go up as league champions. Brentford have all but confirmed to finish the season third, meanwhile Swansea, Bournemouth and Barnsley have all confirmed their playoff spots as well. For the fifth consecutive month Wycombe, Sheffield Wednesday and Rotherham are in the relegation zone, with Wycombe needing a highly unlikely swing in the goal difference to stay up, but Rotherham still have a game in hand over Derby.

Notes

References

 
2020 sport-related lists
2021 sport-related lists